The 1999 Bromsgrove District Council election took place on 6 May 1999 to elect members of Bromsgrove district council in Worcestershire, England. The whole council was up for election and the Conservative Party gained overall control of the council from the Labour Party.

Campaign

The Labour party had won control of the council in the previous election in 1995 for the first time and were hopeful of staying in control of the council. They pledged to maintain bus passes for the elderly and press on with CCTV in the town centre. However the Conservatives attacked Labour for having increased council tax over the last four years, including 9.73% in the last year. A proposed development on the local recreation ground for an arts and leisure centre was a major issue in the campaign, with Labour saying it would be good for Bromsgrove, while the Conservatives pledged to try to save the recreation ground. During the campaign the Conservative party leader William Hague visited Bromsgrove with the local Member of Parliament Julie Kirkbride to rally party activists.

Before the election the Conservatives required a 7% swing to gain control of the council, with Bromsgrove seen as a key council in the local elections across England. A by-election in October 1998 in Catshill ward was seen as a good sign for the Conservatives after they gained the seat with a swing of over 25%. In total 80 candidates stood in the election from the Labour party, Conservatives, Liberal Democrats and the Wythall Ratepayers' and Residents' Association. Candidates included seven couples and former Conservative councillors such as Joy Buchby and Nick Psirides. Meanwhile, the only Liberal Democrat councillor, Sandra Docker, stood down at the election.

Just before the election there was controversy over Labour Party leaflets that were sent to pensioners claiming that the Conservatives would abolish free bus passes for pensioners. The Conservatives denied they would end the bus passes and reported Labour to the Data Protection Registrar, claiming that confidential council records had been used to send the leaflets to target pensioners, although Labour denied this.

Election result
The results in Bromsgrove were one of the first to come in across the country and saw the Conservatives retake control of the council gaining 17 seats. Conservative gains included the Labour leader on the council, Trevor Porter in Sidemoor ward, and the council chairman, Trevor Crashley in Whitford ward. The Conservatives also made two wins in Sidemoor ward, where they had never won any seats before, with swings reaching up to 40% in some wards.

Defeated candidates saw a low turnout and the plans to develop the recreation ground as responsible for their defeats, with the neighbouring Labour MP Michael John Foster blaming the results on local, rather than national, issues. Following the election William Hague visited Bromsgrove again to celebrate the results, both in Bromsgrove and nationally. Overall turnout in the election was 37.4%.

Ward results

References

1999
1999 English local elections
1990s in Worcestershire